Ladislav Tauc (1926–1999) was a French neuroscientist, born in Pardubice, Czechoslovakia.

He was a pioneer in neuroethology and neuronal physiology, who immigrated to France in 1949 to work at the Institut Marey in Paris. Tauc was the founder and former director of the Laboratoire de Neurobiologie Cellulaire et Moléculaire of the French National Centre for Scientific Research (CNRS). He was one of the teachers of Eric R. Kandel. There Eric R. Kandel started to investigate the gill withdrawal reflex and postsynaptic potentials (PSP) in identified neurons in the abdominal ganglion of Aplysia.

"The introduction of a 'simplified' brain (the Aplysia nervous system) to study the cellular and molecular basis of organized neuronal interactions, has been described as one of Tauc’s essential contributions to neuroscience."

Since the year 2000 an annual meeting is organized in honor of Ladislav Tauc.

See also 
 Eric R. Kandel
 Torsten Wiesel
 Stephen Kuffler

References

External links
Obituary from the International Society for Neuroethology

French neuroscientists
French physiologists
1926 births
1999 deaths
Czechoslovak emigrants to France
Research directors of the French National Centre for Scientific Research